Jimena "Ximena" Navarrete Rosete (born February 22, 1988) is a Mexican actress, TV host, model and beauty queen who won Miss Universe 2010. She was previously named as Nuestra Belleza México 2009. She is the second Miss Universe from Mexico.

Early life
Navarrete was born and raised in Guadalajara, the capital city of Jalisco, Mexico to a middle-class family. She is one of two children, born to Carlos Navarrete a dentist and Gabriela Rosette, a house wife. She has one younger sister. She began modeling locally at the age of sixteen, and studied nutrition at the Valle de Atemajac University, prior to taking part in the world pageant. In 2012, Ximena accepted to be part of a genetic study, her maternal lineage is haplogroup J.

Pageantry

Nuestra Belleza México 2009
Navarrete was crowned Nuestra Belleza Jalisco on July 16, 2009 in her hometown, and subsequently won the national title of Nuestra Belleza México as well, besting thirty-three other contestants during the 16th edition of that event, held September 20, 2009 in Mérida, Yucatán. That night, Navarrete became the second consecutive winner from Jalisco, following Karla Carrillo, the outgoing titleholder and a close friend who encouraged her to participate in the pageant.

Miss Universe 2010
On August 23, 2010, Navarrete (then known as "Jimena") was named Miss Universe.

In October 2010, Navarrete traveled to Shanghai, China for the 2010 World Expo and Shanghai Fashion Week. On February 10, 2011, Navarrete became spokesperson of L'Oreal Paris and Old Navy. She had her first official photo shoot in Mexico. In March 2011, Navarrete traveled to Moscow, Russia and Santo Domingo, Dominican Republic to attend the national finals respectively. She then traveled to Puerto Rico for the Puerto Rico Golf Open. She also traveled to Panama to work with Aid for AIDS and attended the Thai national final at Bangkok, Thailand on March 26, 2011.

In May 2011, Navarrete traveled to Guadalajara, Mexico, her hometown, to raise awareness for Children International, a U.S.-based humanitarian organization helping over 12,000 poor children there. In July 2011, Navarrete attended the Chilean national final at Santiago, Chile. She also traveled to the Atlantis Paradise Island, The Bahamas to help crown Miss Teen USA on July 16, 2011. During her reign, Navarrete traveled to Spain, multiple trips in Mexico, Indonesia, China, France, India, Russia, Dominican Republic, Puerto Rico, Panama, Thailand, Brazil, Guatemala, Chile and Bahamas in addition to numerous trips around the United States.

Modeling and acting
On February 10, 2011, Navarrete became spokesperson of L'Oreal Paris and Old Navy. In 2013, Navarrete announced she would debut her acting career in the soap opera La tempestad. On February 15, 2013, Salvador Mejía confirmed that Navarrete and William Levy would portray the protagonists of the telenovela. She played a twin role, as Marina Reverte and Magdalena Artigas.

Personal life 
In 2017, Navarrete married Juan Carlos Valladares in a Catholic ceremony. After experiencing a miscarriage, the couple welcomed a daughter in late 2021 via the use of assisted reproductive technology. In October 2022, it was revealed that the couple were expecting their second child.

Filmography

Notes

References

External links

Official Ximena Navarrete Website
Ximena Navarette Photos on missuniverse.com
Ximena Navarrete Interview on PR.com
Ximena Navarrete Video on www.children.org

1988 births
Living people
Mexican beauty pageant winners
Mexican telenovela actresses
Actresses from Guadalajara, Jalisco
Miss Universe 2010 contestants
Miss Universe winners
Nuestra Belleza México winners
Mexican female models
21st-century Mexican actresses
Universidad del Valle de Atemajac alumni